Blackwood is an unincorporated community and census-designated place (CDP) located within Gloucester Township, in Camden County, in the U.S. state of New Jersey. As of the 2010 United States census, Blackwood's population was 4,545.

Blackwood is the home of the main campus of Camden County College.  Blackwood is also home to Camden County College's radio station WDBK.

History 

Blackwood, originally known as Blackwoodtown, was settled about 1750 by John Blackwood in an area then known as "head of Timber Creek." Blackwood was a fuller who immigrated from Scotland and established mills in Blackwoodtown. The area was a crossroads village along the Black Horse Pike well into the nineteenth century, that served as a local government and transportation center by the 1830s, when Uriah Norcross established a stage coach line between Camden and Woodbury with a stop at a tavern in Blackwoodtown. The arrival of the Camden County Railroad in 1891 led to further development.

Blackwood Lake operated as a summer resort from 1891 until 1932.

Geography
According to the U.S. Census Bureau, Blackwood had a total area of 1.235 square miles (3.199 km2), including 1.226 square miles (3.176 km2) of land and 0.009 square miles (0.023 km2) of water (0.72%).  Bodies of water include Blackwood Lake and Farrows Run stream.

Parks and recreation
Gloucester Township Health and Fitness Trail, formerly known as the Blackwood Railroad Trail,
Kiwanis's Baseball Fields (Marshall & Railroad Ave) 
Al Raw's Field (Lincoln Drive)
Harwan Park (Black Horse Pike)
State Street Park

Demographics

Census 2010

Census 2000
As of the 2000 United States Census there were 4,692 people, 1,721 households, and 1,261 families residing in the section. The population density was 1,461.0/km2 (3,782.1/mi2). There were 1,840 housing units at an average density of 572.9/km2 (1,483.2/mi2). The racial makeup of the section was 91.30% White, 3.94% African American, 0.11% Native American, 2.11% Asian, 0.06% Pacific Islander, 1.19% from other races, and 1.28% from two or more races. Hispanic or Latino of any race were 3.15% of the population.

There were 1,721 households, out of which 32.4% had children under the age of 18 living with them, 55.8% were married couples living together, 12.0% had a female householder with no husband present, and 26.7% were non-families. 22.5% of all households were made up of individuals, and 10.1% had someone living alone who was 65 years of age or older. The average household size was 2.68 and the average family size was 3.16.

In the section the population was spread out, with 24.1% under the age of 18, 7.7% from 18 to 24, 30.3% from 25 to 44, 22.1% from 45 to 64, and 15.9% who were 65 years of age or older. The median age was 38 years. For every 100 females, there were 98.7 males. For every 100 females age 18 and over, there were 97.7 males.

The median income for a household in the section was $49,707, and the median income for a family was $60,136. Males had a median income of $41,274 versus $30,677 for females. The per capita income for the section was $21,815. About 0.9% of families and 4.0% of the population were below the poverty line, including 0.6% of those under age 18 and 6.0% of those age 65 or over.

Historic district

The Blackwood Historic District is a  national historic district along the Black Horse Pike, Baptist Lane, Church and Elm streets, Central and East Railroad avenues in the community. It was added to the National Register of Historic Places on July 27, 1989 for its significance in commerce and community development. The district includes 87 contributing buildings, 3 contributing structures, and 3 contributing sites. The Blackwood First Methodist Episcopal Church was built in 1856 with Greek Revival/Italianate style.

Education
Public schools, that are part of the Gloucester Township Public Schools district, include 
Blackwood Elementary School, 
Gloucester Township Elementary School as well as 
Charles W. Lewis Middle School Highland Regional High School is part of the Black Horse Pike Regional School District.

The Kingdom Charter School of Leadership is a charter school that serves students in Kindergarten through sixth grade residing in Gloucester Township, who are accepted by lottery on a space-available basis.

Our Lady of Hope Regional School is a Roman Catholic elementary school that operates under the auspices of the Roman Catholic Diocese of Camden. Our Lady of Hope Regional School was renamed following the 2008 merger of St. Jude's Regional School with St. Agnes School.

Higher education in Blackwood includes Pennco Tech and Camden County College.

Notable people

People who were born in, residents of, or otherwise closely associated with Blackwood include:
 Jersey Bakley (1864-1915) was a Major League Baseball pitcher who was 19 years old when he broke into the big leagues in 1883 with the Philadelphia Athletics.
 Nick Comoroto (born 1991) professional wrestler known for his appearances with the professional wrestling promotions WWE and All Elite Wrestling.
 Mike Daniels (born 1989), defensive end for the Cincinnati Bengals.
 John A. Dramesi (1933–2017), prisoner of war who had been held by the Viet Cong in the Hanoi Hilton.
 David R. Mayer (born 1967), who represented the 4th Legislative District in the New Jersey General Assembly from 2002 to 2008 and served on the Gloucester Township Council from 2002-2003 and as mayor of Gloucester Township.
 Erik Menéndez (born 1970), convicted murderer.
 Joseph Menna (born 1970), sculptor.
 Gabriela Mosquera (born 1977), politician, who has served in the New Jersey General Assembly since 2012, where she represents the 4th Legislative District.
 Billy Paul (1934-2016), Grammy Award-winning soul singer.
 Joe Vitt (born 1954), interim head coach of the New Orleans Saints.

References

Gloucester Township, New Jersey
Census-designated places in Camden County, New Jersey